Johann Jakob Zeiller (8 July 1708 – 8 July 1783) was an Austrian painter.

Zeiller was born in Reutte, trained by his father Paul who was also a painter. In 1723 he began his apprenticeship with Sebastiano Conca in Rome, and then from 1729 to 1732 with Francesco Solimena in Naples.  From there, Zeiller moved directly to Vienna, where he operated from 1733 until 1743 as an employee of Paul Troger. In 1737 he received the coveted title of an imperial court painter from the Academy of Fine Arts Vienna.

Zeiller painted primarily religious-themed frescoes. He did frescoes for the Aldersbach Abbey in Fürstenzell and the Ettal Abbey. He later returned to Reutte where he continued to work until his death in 1783. He contributed many frescoes in churches in Tyrol.

Works 
As an employee of Paul Troger

 1733/1734: Ceiling frescoes in the Altenburg collegiate church
 1734: Ceiling painting and lunette frescoes in the Sankt Pölten Abbey Library
 1735: Painting of the pilgrimage chapel in Heiligenkreuz-Gutenbrunn
 1735: The ballroom in the Seitenstetten Abbey is painted
 1736/1738: Frescoes in the prelate rooms and in the ballroom of Altenburg Abbey
 1737: Painting of the crypt chapel in Röhrenbach near Horn
 1738: Decoration of the staircase and the summer refectory in the Geras Abbey
 1739: Painting of the "Salettl" in Melk Abbey
 1740/1741: Ceiling fresco in the library of Seitenstetten Abbey
 1742: Works in the Elisabethinen monastery church in Pressburg
 1744: works in the Jesuit church of Győr (Hungary)

Independent work

 1739: Dome fresco of the castle and parish church in Rosenau
 1742/43: Frescoes with allegorical representations in the library vestibule and above the bookcases from Altenburg Abbey
 1744/45: Ceiling frescoes, high altar and other side altar paintings in the church of the Fürstenzell monastery
 1746: Ceiling paintings in the sacristy, abbot chapel and sacrament chapel of Aldersbach monastery
 1747: Ceiling paintings in the refectory (destroyed) and in the sacristy of Ettal Abbey
 1748–52: Dome fresco of the monastery church of Ettal Abbey
 1752: Dome fresco of the Anastasia Chapel in Benediktbeuern Monastery
 1752/53: Ceiling frescoes in the Curate Church of St. Georg in Bichl
 1754/55: Ceiling frescoes in the choir and chapter room of the Ettal Benedictine abbey
 1755: Ceiling fresco of the Gertrudiskapelle in Dickelschwaig near Ettal
 1755: Ceiling frescoes in the parish church of St. Vitus in Iffeldorf
 c. 1755: Choir frescoes in the parish church of Breitenwang
 1756: Altarpieces of the Antonius Altarpiece in the parish church of Oberammergau
 1756–64: Dome and ceiling frescoes and altarpieces of the Basilica of St. Alexander and Theodor von Kloster Ottobeuren (partly with his relative Franz Anton Zeiller)
 1759: Ceiling frescoes and altarpiece in the Michael's Chapel in Immenstaad on Lake Constance
 1761: Ceiling and wall frescoes in the Psallier choir of the former Benedictine monastery church Fischingen / Switzerland 
 1761: Altarpiece of the sacrament altar (left next to the pulpit) in the monastery church of the Assumption in Ettal
 1764: High altar picture of the church of Hinterhornbach
 1765: Choir frescoes in the parish church of Eschenloheorg
 1766: Ceiling frescoes in the stairwell, garden pavilion of the Cistercian Abbey of Fürstenzell
 1767/68: Ceiling frescoes of the former canon monastery church of Suben
 1771: Ceiling fresco in the dining room of Asbach Abbey
 c. 1772/74: Ceiling fresco in the former choir (today baptistery) of the church in Lechaschau
 1773: Choir fresco in the parish church of Erkheim
 1775/76: ceiling frescoes in the parish church of St. Nikolaus von Elbigenalp
 1776: High altar picture in Stockach Church
 1777: High altar picture in the parish church of Stanzach
 1777: Side altarpiece of the parish church of Holzgau (now in the parish church of Gossensass)
 1778: Ceiling frescoes in the nave of the parish church of Bichlbach
 1779/80: Ceiling frescoes of the Johanniskirche in Feldkirch (destroyed)

References

Sources
 Constantin von Wurzbach: Zeiler, Johann Jakob. In: Biographical Dictionary of the Empire, Austria. 59th band Publisher L. C. Zamarski, Vienna 1890, pp. 279 et seq.
 Hans Semper Zeiller, Jacob. In: General German Biography (ADB). 45th band Oxford University Press, Leipzig 1900, pp. 652–660.
 Harriet Brinkmöller-Gandlau: Zeiller, Johann Jakob. In: Biographic-bibliographic church encyclopedia (BBKL). Volume 14, Bautz, Herzberg 1998, pp. 372–374.
 Bauer Franz & Planckensteiner I : catalogue Franz Anton Zeiller, Reutte 1994

1708 births
1783 deaths
18th-century Austrian painters
18th-century Austrian male artists
Austrian male painters

Catholic painters
Rococo painters